The Furness Railway No.3, nicknamed "Old Coppernob", is a preserved English steam locomotive.  It acquired its nickname because of the copper cladding to its dome-shaped "haystack" firebox.

History
It was built in 1846 by Bury, Curtis, and Kennedy of Liverpool, a company with which the Furness Railway's first locomotive superintendent, James Ramsden, had been an apprentice. It is a four-coupled version of Edward Bury's popular bar-frame design of the period, with iron bar frames and inside cylinders, and is historically significant as the only survivor in the United Kingdom of this type. It is also one of the few items of rolling stock surviving from the Furness Railway whose Indian red livery it carries.

Withdrawal
It shared with three other similar engines all traffic on the Furness Railway for around six years. Latterly it was used for shunting around the docks at Barrow-in-Furness and on local duties, being withdrawn in 1900, completing nearly 55 years of service.

Preservation

It is now housed in the National Railway Museum, York. It has shrapnel wounds from German bombs, acquired during World War II when it was displayed in a glass pavilion at Barrow-in-Furness station.

In February 2007, No. 3 had one of its shedplates stolen at York. In 2014, it was placed on loan to the Dresden Transport Museum in Germany to take part in an exhibition celebrating the 175th anniversary of the Leipzig–Dresden railway due to its similarities to early locomotives built for the line.

See also 
 Locomotives of the Furness Railway

References

Further reading 
 

Furness Railway locomotives
0-4-0 locomotives
Preserved steam locomotives of Great Britain
Standard gauge steam locomotives of Great Britain